The 20th Toronto International Film Festival (TIFF) took place in Toronto, Ontario, Canada between September 7 and September 16, 1995. The Confessional by Robert Lepage was selected as the opening film and Devil In A Blue Dress by Carl Franklin was selected as the closing film.

Awards

Programme

Gala Presentation
Devil In A Blue Dress by Carl Franklin
Welcome to the Dollhouse by Todd Solondz
Antonia's Line by Marleen Gorris
La Cérémonie by Claude Chabrol
Desolation Angels by Tim McCann
Eggs by Bent Hamer
Fallen Angels by Wong Kar-wai
Blue in the Face by Paul Auster, Wayne Wang & Harvey Wang
Leaving Las Vegas by Mike Figgis
To Die For by Gus Van Sant
Madagascar Skin by Chris Newby
Four Rooms by Quentin Tarantino, Robert Rodriguez, Alexandre Rockwell & Allison Anders 
Mighty Aphrodite by Woody Allen
Persuasion by Roger Michell
Things to Do in Denver When You're Dead by Gary Fleder
The Crossing Guard by Sean Penn
The White Balloon by Jafar Panahi
The Young Poisoner's Handbook by Benjamin Ross
Love Letter by Shunji Iwai
Brother of Sleep by Joseph Vilsmaier
The Last Supper by Stacy Title 
Peculiarities of the National Hunt by Aleksandr Rogozhkin
Someone Else's America by Goran Paskaljevic
Sátántangó by Béla Tarr
Ulysses' Gaze by Theodoros Angelopoulos
Stonewall by Nigel Finch
A Month by the Lake by John Irvin
Dos crímenes by Roberto Sneider
Harvest Home by Carlos Siguion-Reyna
Margaret's Museum by Mort Ransen
Bye-Bye by Karim Dridi
The Journey of August King by John Duigan
Cry, the Beloved Country by Darrell Roodt
Unstrung Heroes by Diane Keaton
Voices by Malcolm Clarke
Go Now by Michael Winterbottom
Wings of Courage by Jean-Jacques Annaud
On the Beat by Ning Ying
Under the Domim Tree by Eli Cohen
Guantanamera by Tomás Gutiérrez Alea & Juan Carlos Tabío
Angel Baby by Michael Rymer
Maborosi by Hirokazu Koreeda
Cyclo by Tran Anh Hung

Canadian Perspective
Black List (Liste noire) by Jean-Marc Vallée
Blood and Donuts by Holly Dale
The Champagne Safari by George Ungar
The Confessional by Robert Lepage
Curtis's Charm by John L'Ecuyer
House by Laurie Lynd
House of Pain by Mike HoolboomIf Only I Were an Indian by John PaskievichLive Bait by Bruce SweeneyMargaret's Museum by Mort RansenThe Michelle Apartments by John PozerOdilon Redon, or The Eye Like a Strange Balloon Mounts Toward Infinity by Guy MaddinOnce in a Blue Moon by Philip SpinkReconstruction by Laurence GreenRude by Clement VirgoSkin Deep by Midi OnoderaSoul Survivor by Stephen WilliamsThe Suburbanators by Gary BurnsVoices of Change by Barbara Doran and Lyn WrightThe War Between Us by Anne WheelerUse Once and Destroy by John L'EcuyerWater Child (L'Enfant d'eau) by Robert MénardWho's Counting? Marilyn Waring on Sex, Lies and Global Economics by Terre NashZigrail by André Turpin

Midnight MadnessScreamers by Christian DuguayCrying Freeman by Christophe GansTokyo Fist by Shinya TsukamotoMute Witness by Anthony WallerGamera: Guardian of the Universe by Shūsuke KanekoTrailer Camp by Jenni OlsonTo Kill a Dead Man by Alexander HemmingSynthetic Pleasures by Iara LeeAn Evil Town by Richard SearsThe Day of the Beast by Álex de la IglesiaWizard of Darkness by Shimako Sato

DocumentariesThe Celluloid Closet'' by Rob Epstein & Jeffrey Friedman

References

External links
 Official site
 TIFF: A Reel History: 1976 - 2012
1995 Toronto International Film Festival at IMDb

1995
1995 film festivals
1995 in Toronto
1995 in Canadian cinema